S100 calcium-binding protein A7 (S100A7), also known as psoriasin, is a protein that in humans is encoded by the S100A7 gene.

Function 

S100A7 is a member of the S100 family of proteins containing 2 EF-hand calcium-binding motifs. S100 proteins are localized in the cytoplasm and/or nucleus of a wide range of cells, and involved in the regulation of a number of cellular processes such as cell cycle progression and differentiation. S100 genes include at least 13 members which are located as a cluster on chromosome 1q21. This protein differs from the other S100 proteins of known structure in its lack of calcium binding ability in one EF-hand at the N-terminus.  The protein functions as a prominent antimicrobial peptide mainly against E. coli.

S100A7 also displays antimicrobial properties. It is secreted by epithelial cells of the skin and is a key antimicrobial protein against Escherichia coli by disrupting their cell membranes. This is the reason that in countries with poor sanitation, human skin is exposed to E. coli strains from faecal matter but it does not usually result in an infection.

S100A7 is highly homologous to S100A15 (koebnerisin) but distinct in expression, tissue distribution and function.

Clinical significance 

This protein is markedly over-expressed in the skin lesions of psoriatic patients, but is excluded as a candidate gene for familial psoriasis susceptibility. The expression of psoriasin is induced in skin wounds through activation of the epidermal growth factor receptor.

Interactions 

S100A7 has been shown to interact with COP9 constitutive photomorphogenic homolog subunit 5, FABP5 and RANBP9.

S100A7 interacts with RAGE (receptor of advanced glycated end products).

References

Further reading 

 
 
 
 
 
 
 
 
 
 
 
 
 
 
 
 
 

S100 proteins